Nisa Azeezi (നിസ അസീസി) is a Ghazal and Qawwali  singer from Kerala, India,

She has been teaching music at MES Muslim Educational Society Senior Secondary school, Tirur. Nisa as a singer explores Qawwali in the great Hindustani Music traditions. She is still practicing under Rafique Khan in Gwalior gharana.

Education

 Ganabhooshanam- The Degree in music conferred by Chembai Memorial Government Music College, Palakkad, Kerala.
 Carnatic music Vocal under Sri. K.G.Marar.
 Hindustani Vocal Diploma from Akhil Bharatiya Gandharva Mahavidyalaya Mandal
 Hindustani Music Vocal training in gurukula tradition under A.E. Vincent Master , Sarat Chandra Maratte, Umer Bhai, Jaipur-Atrauli gharana, Ustad Faiyaz Khan (Karnataka singer), Kirana gharana & Ustad Rafique Khan, Dharwad Gharana.

Recognition
 Received Junior Fellowship constituted by Central Ministry of Culture (India) on the subject of The Ghazal Tradition of Malabar in the year 2000

Discography: Ghazals/Qawwalis

References

20th-century Indian women classical singers
Living people
1970 births
People from Malappuram
21st-century Indian women classical singers
Singers from Kerala
Women musicians from Kerala

External links